James Cochrane (15 September 1852 – 28 May 1905) was a Canadian construction contractor and politician, the Mayor of Montreal, Quebec between 1902 and 1904.

Cochrane was educated at the British Canadian School and Collegiate College, then began a career in construction-related activity. He was also a Canadian soldier deployed to fight the North-West Rebellion in 1885.

Besides his term as Mayor, Cochrane also served in provincial politics winning the Montréal division no. 4 riding in the 1900 and 1904 Quebec elections. He served in the 10th Legislative Assembly of Quebec concurrent with his service as Montreal Mayor. He was re-elected to a second provincial term in the 11th Assembly, but died in office at Montreal on 28 May 1905.

External links
James Cochrane at City of Montreal

1852 births
1905 deaths
Businesspeople from Montreal
Canadian construction businesspeople
Mayors of Montreal
Quebec Liberal Party MNAs
People from Kincardine, Fife
Scottish emigrants to pre-Confederation Quebec
Anglophone Quebec people
People of the North-West Rebellion